"Slowly I Turned" is a popular vaudeville sketch wherein a character is relating a story and is triggered into violent outbursts when the listener inadvertently utters a triggering word or phrase. Versions have also been performed in movies and on television. Comedians Harry Steppe, Joey Faye, and Samuel Goldman each laid claim to this routine, also referred to as "The Stranger with a Kind Face" by clowns, "Niagara Falls" by fans of The Three Stooges and Abbott and Costello, "Martha" by fans of  I Love Lucy, "Pokomoko", and "Bagel Street".

Routine
The routine features a man recounting the day he took his revenge on his enemy – and becoming so engrossed in his own tale that he attacks the innocent listener to whom he is speaking. The attacker comes to his senses, only to go berserk again when the listener says something that triggers the old memory again.

Typically, the routine has two characters meeting for the first time, with one of them becoming highly agitated over the utterance of particular words. Names and cities (such as Niagara Falls) have been used as the trigger, which then sends the unbalanced person into a dissociative state; the implication is that the words have an unpleasant association in the character's past. While the other character merely acts bewildered, the crazed character relives the incident, uttering the words, "Slowly I turned ... step by step ... inch by inch...," as he approaches the stunned onlooker. Reacting as if this stranger is the object of his rage, the angry character begins hitting or strangling him, until the screams of the victim shake him out of his dissociative state. The character then apologizes, admitting his irrational reaction to the mention of those certain words. This follows with the victim innocently repeating the words, sparking the insane reaction all over again. This pattern is repeated in various forms, sometimes with the entrance of a third actor, uninformed as to the situation. This third person predictably ends up mentioning the words and setting off the manic character, but with the twist that the second character, not this new third person, is still the recipient of the violence.

Depictions

Abbott and Costello performed the "Pokomoko" version in their 1944 film Lost in a Harem, and later did a "Niagara Falls" version for their early '50s television show, with Sidney Fields, who played many characters, as the delusional man beating Costello while they were both locked in a jail cell. The television version ended with Costello’s troublesome lawyer, also played by Fields, entering the scene. Costello asks for the lawyer to take the case of the storytelling stranger, and the lawyer says, "Help him out? I don’t know anything about him! What’s his name? Where is he from?" Costello whispers in the Fields' ear, to which he responds aloud, "Niagara Falls?" and then he is immediately attacked. Another variation on the Abbott and Costello Show was the Susquehanna Hat Company/Bagel Street routine, also done as the Floogle Street routine. The January 1952 episode of The Colgate Comedy Hour included the sketch, Abbott and Costello again, but providing Errol Flynn a surprise opportunity to attempt the delusional fellow.  

The Three Stooges performed the sketch (as part of the show they put on within the movie, as they play performers) in Gents Without Cents, a 1944 short. In their version, the final punchline is that the third character to arrive (played by Larry) is, in fact, the object of the hate of the storyteller (played by Moe). However, even though Curly (who has just been repeatedly beaten up by Moe and Larry, who is also triggered by the sketch’s word, which is "Niagara Falls") eggs him on, Moe refuses to attack Larry and instead they make peace. Curly then says "Niagara Falls" and both Moe and Larry chase him off the stage and at the end of the short when the Stooges and their new wives driving on their honeymoon. Moe would later perform a version of the sketch on his own as the storyteller on an episode of The Mike Douglas Show.

The routine also appears in episode 19, "The Ballet" of season 1 of I Love Lucy, with Lucy playing the stranger with a kind face and a clown playing the storyteller, with the trigger word "Martha".  Lucille Ball later performed the "Martha" version on CBS Opening Night in 1963, now playing the vagabond storyteller herself, with Phil Silvers as the stranger with the kind face.

Danny Thomas and Joey Faye reprised the routine in Season 8, episode 20 ("Good Old Burlesque") of The Danny Thomas Show. Hawkeye Pierce (played by Alan Alda) references this routine in the second-season M*A*S*H episode "Dr. Pierce and Mr. Hyde", in which the sleep-deprived surgeon insists on responding to an ambulance arrival.

Steve Martin's character Rigby Reardon had a similar trigger, the words "cleaning woman", in his film noir homage Dead Men Don't Wear Plaid.

Milton Berle's performance of this routine was played on the Dr. Demento radio show several times using the trigger word "Buffalo".

The lyrics of "Native Love" by the drag singer Divine are based on this routine,, as well as "Don't Call Me Dude" by eclectic thrash metal band Scatterbrain.

Performing this routine on Your Show of Shows in the early 1950s, Sid Caesar plays the poor sap who gets beaten up, and Imogene Coca plays a distraught manic lamenting her life with "Jeffery", the trigger word, who is prevented from throwing herself off the Empire State Building by Caesar's character. In the end, she runs off just as another woman comes running over to jump off the building. Caesar stops her, but rather than go through all that again, he jumps off instead.

See also
Burlesque

References

Comedy sketches
Niagara Falls in fiction
Vaudeville tropes
Comedy catchphrases